The 1962 United States Senate election in Missouri took place on November 6, 1962 in Missouri. The incumbent Democratic Senator, Edward V. Long, was elected to a full term, having won a special election in 1960 to finish Thomas C. Hennings' term. He defeated Republican nominee R. Crosby Kemper Jr, winning 54.4% of the vote.

Democratic primary

Candidates
 Edward V. Long, the incumbent Senator
 Lewis Morris, retired pharmaceutical engineer and former candidate for Lieutenant Governor of Missouri
 Joseph Hartmeier, plumber

Results

Republican primary

Candidates
 Duane Cox, attorney
 Morris Duncan, osteopath
 R. Crosby Kemper Jr, president of UMB Financial Corporation
 Douglas Ries, physician

Results

Results

References

1962
Missouri
United States Senate